Sharrer is a surname. Notable people with the surname include:

Eugene Sharrer, British businessman
Honoré Desmond Sharrer (1920–2009), American artist

See also
Harrer (surname)
Jay Sharrers (born 1967), Canadian ice hockey official
Sharer